NATV may mean:

 National Assembly TV, a public-access television cable TV channel for National Assembly of South Korea
 North Allegheny Television, a public-access television cable TV channel near Pittsburgh, Pennsylvania
 NATV Native American Television, an American television channel for Native Americans